Francis James Westbrook Pegler (August 2, 1894 – June 24, 1969) was an American journalist and writer. He was a popular columnist in the 1930s and 1940s famed for his opposition to the New Deal and labor unions. Pegler aimed his pen at presidents of both parties, including Herbert Hoover, FDR ("moosejaw"), Harry Truman ("a thin-lipped hater"), and John F. Kennedy. He also criticized the Supreme Court, the tax system, and corrupt labor unions. In 1962, he lost his contract with King Features Syndicate, owned by the Hearst Corporation, after he started criticizing Hearst executives. His late writing appeared sporadically in publications that included the John Birch Society's American Opinion.

Background
James Westbrook Pegler was born on August 2, 1894, in Minneapolis, Minnesota, the son of Frances A. (Nicholson) and Arthur James Pegler, a local newspaper editor.

Career

Journalism career
Westbrook Pegler was the youngest American war correspondent during World War I, working for United Press Service. In 1918, he joined the United States Navy.  In 1919, he became a sports writer for United News (New York).

In 1925, Pegler joined the Chicago Tribune.  In 1933, he joined the Scripps Howard syndicate (through 1944), where he worked closely with his friend Roy Howard. He built up a large readership for his column "Mister Pegler" and elicited this observation by Time magazine in its October 10, 1938 issue:         At the age of 44, Mr. Mister Pegler's place as the great dissenter for the common man is unchallenged. Six days a week, for an estimated $65,000 a year, in 116 papers reaching nearly 6,000,000 readers, Mister Pegler is invariably irritated, inexhaustibly scornful. Unhampered by coordinated convictions of his own, Pegler applies himself to presidents and peanut vendors with equal zeal and skill. Dissension is his philosophy.       In 1941, he won a Pulitzer Prize for exposing criminal racketeering in labor unions. The same year, he finished third (behind Franklin Roosevelt and Joseph Stalin) for Time Magazine's "Man of the Year".

In 1944, Pegler moved his syndicated column to the Hearst's King Features Syndicate.  He continued there to 1962.

Contempt for Franklin Roosevelt
Pegler supported President Franklin Delano Roosevelt initially but, after seeing the rise of fascism in Europe, he warned against the dangers of dictatorship in America and became one of the Roosevelt administration's sharpest critics for what he saw as its abuse of power. Thereafter he rarely missed an opportunity to criticize Roosevelt, his wife Eleanor Roosevelt, or Vice President Henry A. Wallace. The New York Times stated in his obituary that Pegler lamented the failure of would-be assassin Giuseppe Zangara, whose shot missed FDR and killed the mayor of Chicago instead. He "hit the wrong man" when gunning for Franklin Roosevelt.

Pegler's views became more conservative in general. He was outraged by the New Deal's support for labor unions, which he considered morally and politically corrupt.

Opposition to the New Deal
At his peak in the 1930s and 1940s, Pegler was a leading figure in the movement against the New Deal and its allies in the labor movement, such as the National Maritime Union. He compared union advocates of the closed shop to Hitler's "goose-steppers." The NMU sued Hearst and Associated Press for an article by Pegler, settled out of court for $10,000. In Pegler's view, the corrupt labor boss was the greatest threat to the country.

By the 1950s, he was even more outspoken. His proposal for "smashing" the AFL and CIO was for the state to take them over. "Yes, that would be fascism," he wrote. "But I, who detest fascism, see advantages in such fascism."

Support for removal of Japanese and Japanese-Americans from the West Coast

At the beginning of World War II, Pegler expressed support for moving Japanese-Americans and Japanese citizens out of California, writing "The Japanese in California should be under guard to the last man and woman right now and to hell with habeas corpus until the danger is over."

Feud with Eleanor Roosevelt

After 1942 Pegler assailed Franklin and Eleanor Roosevelt regularly, calling Mrs. Roosevelt "La boca grande", or "the big mouth". The Roosevelts ignored his writings, at least in public.
Recent scholars (including Kenneth O'Reilly, Betty Houchin Winfield, and Richard W. Steele) have reported that Franklin Roosevelt used the FBI for the purposes of wartime security, and ordered sedition investigations of isolationist and anti-New Deal newspaper publishers (such as William Randolph Hearst and the Chicago Tribune'''s Robert R. McCormick). On Dec. 10, 1942, FDR, citing evidence Eleanor Roosevelt had gathered, asked the FBI's J. Edgar Hoover to investigate Pegler, which it did; the bureau eventually reported that it had found no sedition. In the end, nothing came of it except Pegler's lifelong distaste for Eleanor Roosevelt, often expressed in his column.

Pulitzer Prize and activism
In 1941 Pegler became the first columnist to win a Pulitzer Prize for reporting, for his work in exposing racketeering in Hollywood labor unions, focusing on the criminal career of Willie Bioff and the link between organized crime and unions. Pegler's reporting led to the conviction of George Scalise, the president of the Building Service Employees International Union who had ties to organized crime. Scalise was indicted by New York District Attorney Thomas E. Dewey, charged with extorting $100,000 from employers from three years. Convicted of labor racketeering, Scalise was sentenced to 10–20 years in prison.

As historian David Witwer has concluded about Pegler, "He depicted a world where a conspiracy of criminals, corrupt union officials, Communists, and their political allies in the New Deal threatened the economic freedom of working Americans."

In the winter of 1947, Pegler started a campaign to draw public attention to the 'Guru Letters' of former Vice-President Henry A. Wallace, claiming they showed Wallace's unfitness for the office of President he had announced he would seek in 1948. Pegler characterized Wallace as a "messianic fumbler," and "off-center mentally."  There was a personal confrontation between the two men on the subject at a public meeting in Philadelphia in July 1948. Several reporters, including H. L. Mencken, joined in the increasingly aggressive questioning. Wallace declined to comment on the letters, while labelling some of the reporters "stooges" for Pegler.  At the conclusion of the meeting, H. L. Mencken acidly suggested that every person named "Henry" should be put to death, offering to commit suicide if Wallace was executed first.

Controversy in later career

In the 1950s and 1960s, as Pegler's conservative views became more extreme and his writing increasingly shrill, he earned the tag of "the stuck whistle of journalism." He denounced the civil rights movement and in the early 1960s wrote for the John Birch Society, until he was invited to leave because of his extreme views.

President Harry S. Truman in his famous letter to Paul Hume, music critic for The Washington Post, referred to Pegler as a guttersnipe, and yet a gentleman compared to Hume, for the latter's criticizing his daughter Margaret's singing.

His attack on writer Quentin Reynolds led to a costly libel suit against him and his publishers, as a jury awarded Reynolds $175,001 in damages. In 1962, he lost his contract with King Features Syndicate, owned by Hearst, after he criticized Hearst executives. His late writing appeared sporadically in various publications, including the Birch Society's American Opinion, which used his picture as its cover upon his death.

In 1965, referring to Robert F. Kennedy, Pegler wrote: "Some white patriot of the Southern tier will spatter his spoonful of brains in public premises before the snow flies." Kennedy was assassinated three years later, though by a Palestinian Arab.

Personal life and death
 
On August 28, 1922, Pegler, a Roman Catholic, married Julia Harpman, a onetime New York Daily News crime reporter, who was from a Jewish family in Tennessee.  She died on November 8, 1955. In 1961, he married his secretary Maude Wettje.

Pegler died age 74 on June 24, 1969, in Tucson, Arizona of stomach cancer.  He is interred in the Cemetery of the Gate of Heaven in Hawthorne, New York.

Awards

 1941:  Pulitzer Prize for coverage of labor racketeers

Legacy

Parodies
Pegler's distinctive writing style was often the subject of parody. In 1949, Wolcott Gibbs of The New Yorker imagined a Peglerian tirade to a little girl asking whether there was a Santa Claus (parodying the famous "Yes, Virginia, there is a Santa Claus" letter). In the Gibbs/Pegler version, "Santa Claus" was actually Sammy Klein of Red Hook, Brooklyn, and had raped a six-year-old as a deliberate strategy to avoid being drafted into World War I. After joining the Communist Party, he adopted his alias and began his Christmas racket by hijacking trucks with toy shipments. Gibbs' parody opens:        You're damn right there is a Santa Claus, Virginia. He lives down the road a piece from me, and my name for him is Comrade Jelly Belly, after a poem composed about him once by an admiring fellow-traveller now happily under the sod.       Mad Magazine ran a Pegler parody in its February 1957 issue (#31), using the actual title of Pegler's own column from 1944 on, "As Pegler Sees It". Starting with a report on a little kid stealing a bike, it devolved into a long tirade against, among other targets, Roosevelt, Truman, the Falange, organized labor, municipal corruption and Abeline's Boy Scout Troop 18 (AKA the Abraham Lincoln Brigade). Every third sentence or so ended with some variation on “And you know what I think of Eleanor Roosevelt”. The mock column concluded with:       ...which brought together such Commie-loving cronies as you know what I think of Eleanor Roosevelt. It stinks. The whole thing stinks. You stink.       Mad also parodied him as "Westbank Piglet" in one panel (p. 2) of its first comic book parody Superduperman (issue #4).

Quotes
Interest in Pegler was briefly revived when a line originally written by him appeared in Republican Vice-Presidential nominee Sarah Palin's acceptance speech at the 2008 Republican National Convention in St. Paul, Minnesota. "We grow good people in our small towns, with honesty and sincerity and dignity", she said, attributing it to "a writer." The speech was written by Matthew Scully, a senior speech writer for George W. Bush.

In a column about Palin's use of the quote, Wall Street Journal columnist Thomas Frank described Pegler as "the all-time champion of fake populism".

Writings
Pegler's literary agent was George T. Bye, who was also Eleanor Roosevelt's agent.

Pegler published three volumes of his collected writings:T'ain't Right, 1936The Dissenting Opinions of Mister Westbrook Pegler, 1938George Spelvin, American and Fireside Chats, 1942

See also

 Will H. Kindig, Los Angeles City Council member condemned by Pegler

References

Further reading
 Farr, Finis. Fair Enough: The Life of Westbrook Pegler. 1975, New Rochelle NY: Arlington House.
 McWhorter, Diane. Dangerous Minds, The New Yorker.  (2004), slate.com.
 Pilat, Oliver. (1973), Pegler, Angry Man of the Press, Greenwood Press.
 Witwer, David. "Westbrook Pegler and the Anti-union Movement", Journal of American History (2005), 92#2.
 Witwer, David. Shadow of the Racketeer: Scandal in Organized Labor'' (2009)  excerpt and text search
 See Westbrook Pegler vs. Ed Sullivan, legal citation 6 Az App 338, 432 P. 2d 593 (Arizona Court of Appeals 1967) which dealt with a previous summary judgment ending Pegler's lawsuit against his nemesis Sullivan. This was reversed when Sullivan's New York show in January 1964 "caused an event to occur" in Tucson AZ which was an "invasion of Pegler's privacy". Sullivan was then required to respond in damages.

External links
 'Rabble Rouser' Critique and analysis of Pegler's work by conservative William F. Buckley, Jr., published in The New Yorker.
 'In Which Our Hero Beards 'Guru' Wallace In His Own Den' Pegler's own account of his confrontation with 1948 Progressive Party candidate Henry Wallace (here given the derogatory nickname of "Bubblehead").
 'Suffer Little Children' AKA 'The Jewish Children'. Pegler's harrowing 1936 description of the fate of Jewish children in Nazi Germany.
 Pegler's FBI files hosted at the Internet Archive
 Syracuse University - J. Westbrook Pegler Papers
 Herbert Hoover Presidential Library - James Westbrook Pegler Papers
 US National Archives - Pegler, J. Westbrook (James Westbrook), 1894-1969

1894 births
1969 deaths
American investigative journalists
Burials at Gate of Heaven Cemetery (Hawthorne, New York)
Writers from Minneapolis
People from Ridgefield, Connecticut
Pulitzer Prize for Reporting winners
Deaths from cancer in Arizona
Deaths from stomach cancer
American war correspondents
John Birch Society
Old Right (United States)
Catholics from Connecticut
American conspiracy theorists
Anti-crime activists
Chicago Tribune people